Salameh Hammad (born 1 January 1944) is a Jordanian politician who has served as Minister of the Interior in the government of Jordan a number of times. He held the position from 1993 to 1995, from 1995 to 1996, from 2015 to 2016, from 2016 to 2017 and lastly from May 2019 until October 2020.

Career
Hammad was born in Amman in 1944. He studied law at the University of Baghdad in Iraq.

He oversaw the 1989 general elections as secretary-general of the Interior Ministry. In 1990 he dealt with the refugee flux from Kuwait to Jordan, which was caused by the Gulf War. Hammad was Minister of the Interior from 1993 to 1995 and again from 1995 to 1996.

He was again appointed as Interior Minister on 19 May 2015 after the resignation of Hussein Al-Majali two days earlier. On 19 April 2016 he was replaced by Mazen Qadi. When Abdullah Ensour was replaced as Prime Minister in June 2016 by Hani Al-Mulki, Hammad returned as Interior Minister. In a cabinet reshuffle on 28 September 2016 Hammad retained his position. In another cabinet reshuffle, Hammad was replaced by Ghaleb Zu'bi in January 2017.

Hammad once more returned as Minister of Interior on 9 May 2019, when he was appointed to replace Samir Mubaidin in a cabinet reshuffle by Prime Minister Omar Razzaz. With the formation of Bisher Al-Khasawneh's Cabinet he was replaced by Tawfiq Al Halalmeh on 12 October 2020.

References

1944 births
Living people
People from Amman
Interior ministers of Jordan
University of Baghdad alumni